Thomas Anthony Scannell (14 August 1945 – 26 May 2020) was an Irish actor, known for his role as DS Ted Roach in ITV's The Bill.

Career
Scannell's debut on The Bill was on 23 October 1984, in an episode called "A Friend in Need". Initially, he was signed for two episodes, but stayed until 1993 and returned for two episodes in 2000. He also appeared in the Channel 5 soap opera Family Affairs as Eddie Harris from 1997 to 1999.

Personal life
His father, Tom Scannell, was a professional goalkeeper, and played once for the Republic of Ireland against Luxembourg in 1954.

In 2002, Tony Scannell was forced to declare himself bankrupt, owing the Inland Revenue over £42,000.

He was a Freemason.

Scannell died on 26 May 2020 aged 74 from unknown causes.

Partial filmography
 Enemy at the Door (1978, TV Series) .... 1st Sailor in Bar / Gefreiter
 The Playbirds (1978) .... Man at depot (uncredited)
 All the Fun of the Fair (1979) .... Frank
 The Professionals (1979, TV Series) .... Man 1
 Armchair Thriller (1980, TV Series) .... Connally
 Flash Gordon (1980) .... Ming's Officer
 Cribb (1981, TV Series) .... Millar
 Strangers (1981, TV Series) .... John McCleod
 The Gentle Touch (1981, TV Series) .... Andy Golding
 Blue Money (1982, TV Movie) .... Ninian
 The Princess and the Cobbler (1993) .... Brigand (re-edited versions) (voice)
 Family Affairs (1997, TV Series) .... Eddie Harris
 The Things You Do for Love (1998, TV Movie) .... Tony Booth
 The Bill (1984–1993, 2000, TV Series) – D.S. Ted Roach
 Point of View (2004, TV Movie) .... Stanley
 Monkey Trousers (2005, TV Series) .... Police Officer
 Waking the Dead (2007, TV Series) .... Papa McDonagh
 Evil Never Dies (2014) .... Harry Payne
 Bendy Caravans and Everlasting Pens: A Portrait of Evered Wigg (2015) .... Evered Wigg (voice)
 With Love From... Suffolk (2016) .... Bill
 The House in the Clouds (2020, Short) .... Salesman (final film role)

References

External links

1945 births
2020 deaths
People from County Cork
Place of death missing
Irish male film actors
Irish male television actors
Irish Freemasons
People from Kinsale
Actors from County Cork